Ma Shaohua (born 23 September 1955) is a Chinese actor best known for portraying historical figures such as Sun Yat-sen and Deng Xiaoping in several films and television series. He became widely known to audiences with Towards the Republic, The Emperor in Han Dynasty, The Rise of the Tang Empire, and Deng Xiaoping at History's Crossroads.

Early life and education 
Ma was born into a Hui family in Guizhou, on 23 September 1955. After the third grade of primary school, he attended Beijing Opera Class of Guizhou Art School, studying Laosheng. In 1969, he became an actor at the Cultural Work Corps of Guizhou Military District and moved to Guizhou Modern Drama Troupe in 1975. After resuming the college entrance examination, in 1978, he entered Shanghai Theatre Academy, majoring in comedy.

Acting career 
Ma made his screen debut with a supporting role as Sun Yat-sen in Li Dazhao (1989). In 1997, Ma made his film debut with a small role in the war film The Ninth Battalion.

In 2000, he portrayed Sun Yat-sen in the biographical television series Civilian President.

Ma starred as Sun Yat-sen, reuniting him with co-star Zhou Li, who played Song Qingling, in the 2001 biographical film Twelve Years of Wind and Rain.

In 2002, he guest-starred on the historical television series Towards the Republic, playing Sun Yat-sen.

Ma took the lead role as Zhang Daqian in the 2003 biographical television series Legend of Dun Huang: Zhang Daqian.

Ma co-starred with Ma Yue and Jin Shijie in the 2006 historical television series The Rise of the Tang Empire as Zhangsun Wuji, the prime minister of Tang Empire. 

In 2009, he appeared in Ning Hao's black comedy film Crazy Racer, playing the coach of Huang Bo's character. For his role in Yimeng, Ma was nominated Outstanding Actor at the 28th Flying Apsaras Awards. That same year, he was nominated for Best Actor at the 25th China TV Golden Eagle Award for his performance in Stranger.

In 2011, he appeared in the propaganda film The Founding of a Party, in which he played Sun Yat-sen. 

In 2014, Ma was cast in the war television series All Quiet in Peking.

Ma's performance in Deng Xiaoping at History's Crossroads which garnered him Best Actor Award at the 18th Chunyan Awards, Outstanding Contribution Award at the 21st Shanghai Television Festival, and 13th Sichuan TV Festival nomination for Best Actor in Long TV Series.

In 2017, he was cast in the medical drama Surgeons, opposite Jin Dong, Bai Baihe, and Li Jiahang.

In 2021, he portrayed Cai Yuanpei in the propaganda television series The Awakeing Age and joined the main cast of Our Southwest Associated University as Feng Youlan. He also filmed in the biographical historical drama The Pioneer as Sun Yat-sen.

Filmography

Film

Television

Awards and nominations

References 

1955 births
Living people
Hui male actors
Actors from Guizhou
Shanghai Theatre Academy alumni
Chinese male film actors
Chinese male television actors